"Unbroken" is a song by Australian pop singer Bonnie Anderson and was released in July 2015. It peaked at number 63 on the ARIA Charts.

Upon release Anderson said "Everyone can relate to life being difficult at times. We've all been through this. Sometimes impossible situations can make you feel like there's no light at the end of the tunnel. It's what you do or how you handle yourself in these circumstances that can really bring you out of the dark. 'Unbroken' helps the listener to realise they aren't alone in their suffering."

Track listing
Digital single
 "Unbroken" - 3:47

CD single
 "Unbroken" - 3:47
 "Unbroken"  (acoustic)  - 4:00

Digital single (acoustic)
 "Unbroken"  (acoustic)  - 4:00

Charts

Release history

References

2015 singles
2015 songs
Bonnie Anderson (singer) songs
Songs written by Rune Westberg
Sony Music Australia singles